The  is a Japanese multinational keiretsu (conglomerate) holding company headquartered in Shibuya, Tokyo.

History

Keita Gotō, now known as a notable Japanese industrialist, was appointed as the CEO of the Musashi Electric Railway in 1920 and later he began a mass expansion program.

After Musashi/Toyoko's acquisition, the Meguro-Kamata Electric Railway initially operated as a subsidiary of Toyoko. It was not until 16 October 1939 that both Toyoko and Meguro-Kamata Electric railways were formally merged; the new company took the Toyoko name.

In 1938, Toyoko established Toyoko Eiga , possibly for competition with Ichizo Kobayashi's Toho Company. It became the Toei Company in 1951.

Toyoko took its current name on 1 May 1942, after the Japanese government forced the company to acquire the Odawara Express Railway and the Keihin Electric Railway in 1943 to support Japan's efforts in World War II. In 1944 it also acquired the Keio Teito Electric Railway (which has merged with Odawara Express before in 1940). In 1948, Tokyu divested the forced-acquired companies, and the divested companies are now known as Odakyu Electric Railway, Keikyu Corporation, and Keio Corporation respectively. The 1943–1948 era of Tokyu was colloquially known as Dai-Tokyu (lit. Great Tokyu).

Tokyu lines

Tokyu also operates the  Kodomonokuni Line (Nagatsuta Station – Kodomonokuni Station, 3.4 km) under contract with and on behalf of Yokohama Minatomirai Railway Company.

Related businesses

The Tokyu Group also owns two smaller railroad companies (Ueda Kōtsū, Izukyū Corporation), several bus companies and a major upscale department store chain called Tokyu operating in Japan and in the MBK Center in Bangkok, Thailand. Other retail operations include Tokyu Hands stores (except for the two locations in Nagoya, which are owned by Sanco Creative Life Co. (indirectly controlled by Kintetsu Group Holdings), and operated under license).  It also runs a number of hotels under the names Tokyu/Pan Pacific in Japan and formerly owned the Pan Pacific Hotels abroad, which it sold to UOL Limited of Singapore.

Formerly the owner of Japan Air System (JAS, now merged with the flag carrier JAL Japan), Tokyu used to be the largest shareholder of Japan Airlines Holdings (JAL) following JAS's merger with JAL. The Tokyu Group also owns and operates the upscale Tokyu Hotels and budget Tokyu Inns.

From 1958 until 2001, Tokyu also owned the Japanese (now American) Shirokiya department store company. It was the owner of Mago Island until 2005, when Mel Gibson purchased it for US$15 million.

Tokyu Corporation is also the largest single shareholder in the Shizuoka Railway Company, but its holdings in the railway isn't part of the group.

Rolling stock
 Tokyu 8500 series (since 1975)
 Tokyu 8090 series (since 1980)
 Tokyu 7600 series (since 1986)
 Tokyu 9000 series (since 1986)
 Tokyu 7700 series (since 1987)
 Tokyu 1000 series (since 1988)
 Tokyu 2000 series (since 1992)
 Tokyu 300 series (Setagaya Line, since 1999)
 Tokyu 3000 series (since 1999)
 Tokyu 5000 series (since 2002)
 Tokyu 6000 series (since 2007)
Tokyu 7000 series (since 2007)
 Tokyu 2020 series (since spring 2018)
 Tokyu 6020 series (since spring 2018)
 Tokyu 3020 series (since autumn 2019)

New Tokyu 2020 series ten-car EMUs and Tokyu 6020 series seven-car EMUs have entered service since spring 2018.

See also

 Cerulean Tower
 Keita Gotō (industrialist)

References

External links

 Official website 

 
Japanese companies established in 1922
Conglomerate companies established in 1922
Japanese brands
Railway companies of Japan
Real estate companies based in Tokyo
Tokyu Group
Transport companies based in Tokyo
Transport companies established in 1922